The start codon is the first codon of a messenger RNA (mRNA) transcript translated by a ribosome. The start codon always codes for methionine in eukaryotes and Archaea and a N-formylmethionine (fMet) in bacteria, mitochondria and plastids. The most common start codon is AUG (i.e., ATG in the corresponding DNA sequence).

The start codon is often preceded by a 5' untranslated region (5' UTR). In prokaryotes this includes the ribosome binding site.

Alternative start codons 
Alternative start codons are different from the standard AUG codon and are found in both prokaryotes (bacteria and archaea) and eukaryotes. Alternate start codons are still translated as Met when they are at the start of a protein (even if the codon encodes a different amino acid otherwise). This is because a separate transfer RNA (tRNA) is used for initiation.

Eukaryotes 
Alternate start codons (non-AUG) are very rare in eukaryotic genomes. However, naturally occurring non-AUG start codons have been reported for some cellular mRNAs. Seven out of the nine possible single-nucleotide substitutions at the AUG start codon of dihydrofolate reductase are functional as translation start sites in mammalian cells. In addition to the canonical Met-tRNA Met and AUG codon pathway, mammalian cells can initiate translation with leucine using a specific leucyl-tRNA that decodes the codon CUG.

Candida albicans uses a CAG start codon.

Prokaryotes 
Prokaryotes use alternate start codons significantly, mainly GUG and UUG. 

E. coli uses 83% AUG (3542/4284), 14% (612) GUG, 3% (103) UUG and one or two others (e.g., an AUU and possibly a CUG).

Well-known coding regions that do not have AUG initiation codons are those of lacI (GUG) and lacA (UUG) in the E. coli lac operon. Two more recent studies have independently shown that 17 or more non-AUG start codons may initiate translation in E. coli.

Mitochondria 
Mitochondrial genomes use alternate start codons more significantly (AUA and AUG in humans). Many such examples, with codons, systematic range, and citations, are given in the NCBI list of translation tables.

Upstream start codons 
These are "alternative" start codons in the sense that they upstream of the regular start codons and thus could be used as alternative start codons. More than half of all human mRNAs have at least one AUG codon upstream (uAUG) of their annotated translation initiation starts (TIS) (58% in the current versions of the human RefSeq sequence). Their potential use as TISs could result in translation of so-called upstream Open Reading Frames (uORFs). uORF translation usually results in the synthesis of short polypeptides, some of which have been shown to be functional, e.g., in ASNSD1, MIEF1, MKKS, and SLC35A4. However, it is believed that most translated uORFs only have a mild inhibitory effect on downstream translation because most uORF starts are leaky (i.e. don't initiate translation or because ribosomes terminating after translation of short ORFs are often capable of reinitiating).

Standard genetic code

Engineered start codons 
Engineered initiator tRNAs (tRNAfMet2 with CUA anticodon) have been used to initiate translation at the amber stop codon UAG. This type of engineered tRNA is called a nonsense suppressor tRNA because it suppresses the translation stop signal that normally occurs at UAG codons. One study has shown that the amber initiator tRNA does not initiate translation to any measurable degree from genomically-encoded UAG codons, only plasmid-borne reporters with strong upstream Shine-Dalgarno sites.

See also 
 Central dogma of molecular biology
 Codon
 Messenger RNA
 Missense mRNA
 Stop codon
 Transfer RNA
 Translation

References

External links 
 The Genetic Codes. Compiled by Andrzej (Anjay) Elzanowski and Jim Ostell, National Center for Biotechnology Information (NCBI), Bethesda, Maryland, US 

DNA
Molecular genetics